Haminu Draman (born 1 April 1986) is a Ghanaian former professional footballer who played as a midfielder.

Club career
Having started his career in Ghana with Heart of Lions, Draman joined Serbian club Red Star Belgrade for the 2005–06. Having won the championship and the cup with Red Star he moved to Turkey, where he made 31 league appearances for Gençlerbirliği as they finished sixth in the Turkish Süper Lig.

Lokomotiv Moscow 
Draman signed a three-year contract with Russian Cup winners Lokomotiv Moscow on 19 June 2007. Draman joined Lokomotiv when the Russian transfer window opened on 1 August 2007. He was expected to replace Russian international Marat Izmailov, who is on loan to Portuguese club Sporting Lisbon for a year.

Following the transfer of Draman Gençlerbirliği's coach Ersun Yanal quit after just over a week in charge because he disagreed with the club's decision. Yanal, who had previously been coach of Gençlerbirliği before leaving to become the Turkish national team coach, had signed a three-year contract with the club on 1 June 2007. "The chairman's promises seem to have changed from the way they were before the agreement we made" Yanal said. "We would like to be a strong team but we sold Draman. The club want to try some players on trial in the meantime but this is not the way that I work. Gençlerbirliği chairman Cavcav, who had been in charge of the club for 30 years, responded by saying: "We met with the coach before and then I told him that I have to sell Draman to Locomotiv Moskva because all of the negotiations were over and I promised to sell him.

Loan to Kuban Krasnodar 
It was reported that English Premiership side Stoke City were interested in signing Draman because of his speed and skills in the January 2008 transfer window, and that a fee of €3 million had been agreed.

On 18 February 2009, Draman signed for FC Kuban Krasnodar on loan from Lokomotiv Moscow. He played 23 matches and scored 3 goals by the end of the season.

Arles-Avignon 
On 11 July 2011, Draman signed a one-year contract with French Ligue 2 side AC Arles-Avignon.

In July 2013, Draman signed a two-year contract for Portuguese club Gil Vicente F.C. on a free transfer. This was after he had left Arles Avignon due to unpaid salary.

Asante Kotoko 
Draman left Gil Vicente during the winter-break, and by early 2014, he was back in Ghana, after almost a decade, by signing with Asante Kotoko S.C. His return turned out to be a great success as he won the double, the 2013–14 Ghanaian Premier League and the 2014 Ghanaian FA Cup during his half-year spell with Asante Kotoko back in Ghana.

FC Infonet 
He signed for FC Infonet in January 2016. With 3 goals in 23 appearances he helped them win their first ever national title, the 2016 Meistriliiga.

International career
Draman was 19 when he made his international debut for Ghana in a friendly against Saudi Arabia in Riyadh on 14 November 2005. He is a member of the national team, and was called up to the 2006 World Cup. He scored his first goal of the tournament against the U.S. on 22 June 2006.

He took a starring role in Ghana's International friendly against former World Champions Brazil on 27 March 2007 where the Ghanaians lost 1–0, terrorising the Samba Boys right back Ilsinho, before being dismissed late in the game for a second bookable offence on Ilsinho's replacement Daniel Alves.

Note on name 
There was some confusion during the 2006 FIFA World Cup as Draman's surname was misspelled DRAMANI on the back of his shirt and, as a result, on FIFA documents. The Ghanaian FA confirmed his name was Draman. He also confirmed this himself in an interview to Sport Express, a Russian newspaper.

Career statistics

Scores and results list Ghana's goal tally first, score column indicates score after each Draman goal.

Honours
Red Star Belgrade
First League of Serbia and Montenegro: 2005–06
Serbia and Montenegro Cup: 2006

Lokomotiv Moscow
Russian Cup: 2007

Asante Kotoko
Ghana Premier League: 2013–14
Ghanaian FA Cup: 2014

Infonet
Meistriliiga: 2016

Ghana
Africa Cup of Nations: 2010 (runner-up)

References

Living people
1986 births
Ghanaian footballers
Association football midfielders
Ghana international footballers
2006 FIFA World Cup players
2006 Africa Cup of Nations players
2008 Africa Cup of Nations players
2010 Africa Cup of Nations players
First League of Serbia and Montenegro players
Süper Lig players
Russian Premier League players
Ligue 2 players
Primeira Liga players
USL Championship players
Meistriliiga players
Heart of Lions F.C. players
Red Star Belgrade footballers
Gençlerbirliği S.K. footballers
FC Lokomotiv Moscow players
FC Kuban Krasnodar players
AC Arlésien players
Gil Vicente F.C. players
Asante Kotoko S.C. players
Charlotte Independence players
FCI Tallinn players
Ghanaian expatriate footballers
Ghanaian expatriate sportspeople in Serbia
Expatriate footballers in Serbia and Montenegro
Ghanaian expatriate sportspeople in Turkey
Expatriate footballers in Turkey
Ghanaian expatriate sportspeople in Russia
Expatriate footballers in Russia
Ghanaian expatriate sportspeople in France
Expatriate footballers in France
Ghanaian expatriate sportspeople in Portugal
Expatriate footballers in Portugal
Ghanaian expatriate sportspeople in the United States
Expatriate soccer players in the United States
Ghanaian expatriate sportspeople in Estonia
Expatriate footballers in Estonia